Rialto station was a Pacific Electric train station in Rialto, California. It is located on Riverside Avenue at crossing of the Union Pacific (formerly Pacific Electric and Southern Pacific) tracks. This was the point where the Riverside–Rialto Line branched south from the Upland–San Bernardino Line. The station building was designed by Thornton Fitzhugh, who also designed the railroad's main downtown terminal: the Pacific Electric Building. The concrete structure cost the railway roughly $10,000 for construction ( adjusted for inflation). Direct passenger service to Los Angeles ended in 1947 when the San Bernardino Line was truncated to Baldwin Park.

After freight service to the station ended, the building was sold and has been operated as a restaurant.

References

Rialto, California
Railway stations in the United States opened in 1914
1914 establishments in California
Railway stations closed in 1947
Repurposed railway stations in the United States
Pacific Electric stations
Railway stations in San Bernardino County, California